Jerome Najee Rasheed (born November 4, 1957, New York City), known professionally as Najee, is an American Jazz-Smooth Jazz saxophonist and flautist.

Early life
Najee was born in the lower west side of Manhattan in New York City and lived his teenage years in Queens, New York. His father died at a young age, and Najee and siblings were raised by his mother Mary Richards. His mother was an important figure and supporter throughout his life and musical career.

Najee's musical pursuits began in grade school at age eight, where he began playing the clarinet, but he had a deep desire to play saxophone. He was influenced at this age by listening to his mother's recordings of Miles Davis and other legendary American jazz artists. A pivotal moment in his life came when he made the decision to become a professional jazz musician. In high school, Najee began to study jazz as a student at the Jazzmobile program (co-founded by Dr. Billy Taylor) where he honed his skills on tenor saxophone and flute under the direction of Jimmy Heath, Frank Foster and Ernie Wilkins. At age 16, Najee studied flute at the Manhattan School of Music Preparatory Division, where he took lessons with Harold Jones, flautist from the New York Philharmonic Orchestra.

Najee draws his inspiration from saxophonists John Coltrane, Charlie Parker, Yusef Lateef, Joe Henderson, Grover Washington Jr., Ronnie Laws as well as flautists Hubert Laws and James Galway. Najee began his career as a teenager performing in local bands in the New York City area. After high school, Najee's first world tour was with a band from New York City called  “Area Code”.

The band spent two years performing on military bases in Europe, Iceland, Greenland, Central America, Caribbean, and the United States on behalf of the USO . Upon his return from the USO World Tour, Najee went on the road in the summer of 1978 with legendary vocalist Ben E. King ("Stand By Me").  After touring with Ben E. King, Najee and his brother Fareed attended New York City's Bronx Community College for two semesters.  Both were music majors under the tutelage of Valerie Capers. The following year both brothers auditioned and were admitted to the New England Conservatory of Music in Boston. Najee was a performance and composition major. He also studied with legendary Joe Allard (1st clarinetist for Toscanini). At the Conservatory Najee studied and performed with George Russell and Jaki Byard big bands.

Career

After his studies at the New England Conservatory, Najee returned to New York City in the early 1980s.  In 1983 he and his brother Fareed toured with legendary vocalist Chaka Khan (Ain’t Nobody Tour). In 1986, he released his debut album, entitled Najee's Theme (EMI/Capitol).  The album earned Najee a Grammy Award Nomination for Best Jazz Album. In 1987, Najee accepted an opportunity to open on the "Tasty Love" tour with R&B singer Freddie Jackson. In 1988, Najee's second album “Day By Day” was released and went platinum. “Day By Day” was produced by several producers including legendary producer Barry Eastmond (Freddie Jackson, Aretha Franklin, Anita Baker and Billy Ocean). In 1990, “Tokyo Blue” was released.  This album was produced by Najee's brother Fareed, and is one of his most successful recordings to date. Tokyo Blue and Day By Day led to Najee winning two Soul Train Awards for Best Jazz Artist in 1991 and 1993.

In 1992, Najee's next album Just an Illusion (EMI/Capitol).  This album was produced by several producers, including Arif Mardin, George Duke, Fareed, Marcus Miller and Wayne Brathwaite.

In 1994, Najee toured and was featured on the live recording Live at The Greek (Sony). The album featured Najee, Stanley Clarke, Billy Cobham and Larry Carlton.  It was during this time that he made guest appearances with Quincy Jones at the (Montreaux Jazz Festival).

Following this collaboration, his next album "Share My World" was released in 1994 and was followed by his tribute to Stevie Wonder's 1976 classic, Songs In The Key of Life in 1995. The CD was produced by George Duke and features Herbie Hancock, Stanley Clarke, Paul Jackson Jr., Sheila E. and Patrice Rushen among others. His CD Morning Tenderness was released in 1998, and went #1 on the contemporary jazz charts. Also within the same year The Best of Najee was released, (Blue Note Records/Capitol) and he once again toured on behalf of the USO for the troops in the Mediterranean: Spain and Turkey.

In 1998, Najee performed at Nelson Mandela's birthday celebration in South Africa, along with Stevie Wonder and Chaka Khan.  Najee was also a special guest of President Bill Clinton to perform at the White House. This event hosted President Jerry Rawlings of the Republic of Ghana. Najee spent three years touring (2000-2003) with Prince and appeared on Prince's albums Rainbow Children and One Night Alone.

In 2003, Najee released Embrace which was produced by his brother Fareed, featuring guest artists Roy Ayers and BeBe Winans. My Point of View was his follow-up in 2005 featuring his good friend and vocalist Will Downing. In 2006, Najee won an NAACP Image Award for "Best Jazz Artist". His 2007 album Rising Sun, featured singer Phil Perry and Mind Over Matter. In 2009, he released “Mind Over Matter”, with a collaboration that featured vocalist Eric Benét and producer Jeff Lorber. In 2012, his album The Smooth Side of Soul was his first release with Shanachie Records which featured production from keyboardist and producer Jeff Lorber and saxophonist and producer Darren Rahn. This album featured vocalist Phil Perry on the lead single, "Just To Fall In Love", which was produced by Chris “ Big Dog” Davis. The video for "Just To Fall In Love" also features actress Vanessa Bell Calloway and songstress N'dambi.

Najee's second release with Shanachie in 2013, "The Morning After - A Musical Love Journey". "The Morning After" earned him an NAACP Image Award Nomination for "Outstanding Jazz Album" (2014) and a Soul Train Awards Nomination for "Best Contemporary Jazz Performance" (2014). The album produced by Demonte Posey, features R&B singer Meli'sa Morgan and bassist Brian Bromberg, with musicians Bill Sharpe on bass, Ray Fuller on guitar, Daniel Powell on drums, Nick Smith on piano and drummer Joel Taylor.

Najee released his third album with Shanachie, entitled: You, Me, and Forever, on June 23, 2015. The album features singer and songwriter Frank McComb, keyboardist James Lloyd from Pieces of a Dream, and pianist Robert Damper. You, Me, and Forever also features musicians from Najee's touring band including: Rod Bonner on keys, Daniel Powell on drums, RaShawn Northington on electric bass, and Chuck Johnson on guitar who is also the lead vocalist on the popular Ambrosia song "Biggest Part of Me". “You, Me and Forever” was produced by Najee, Chris “Big Dog” Davis and British born bassist Dean Mark. The album is currently available worldwide.

Najee has performed and recorded with vocalists including: Chaka Khan, Freddie Jackson, Will Downing, Phil Perry, Prince, Patti LaBelle, Phyllis Hyman, Vesta Williams and Jeffrey Osborne. He has also recorded and performed with instrumentalists: Marcus Miller, Herbie Hancock, Stanley Clarke, Larry Carlton, Billy Cobham, Charles Earland, Paul Jackson Jr. and George Duke.

Discography

Studio albums 
 1986  Najee's Theme (1986, EMI/ Capitol)
 1988  Day by Day (October 1988, Capitol)
 1990  Tokyo Blue (February 1990, Capitol)
 1992  Just an Illusion (June 1992, Capitol)
 1994  Share My World (October 1994, Capitol)
 1995  Najee Plays Songs from the Key of Life: A Tribute to Stevie Wonder (November 1995, Capitol)
 1998  Morning Tenderness (November 1998, Polygram)
 2003  Embrace (2003, N-Coded)
 2005  My Point of View (2005, Heads Up)
 2007  Rising Sun (2007, Heads Up)
 2009  Mind Over Matter (2009, Heads Up)
 2012  The Smooth Side of Soul (2012, Shanachie)
 2013  The Morning After, A Musical Love Journey (2013, Shanachie)
 2015  You, Me and Forever (2015, Shanachie)
 2017  Poetry In Motion (2017, Shanachie)
 2019  Center of the Heart (2019, Shanachie)
 2022  Savoir Faire (2022, Shanachie)

Live albums 
 1994  Live at the Greek with Stanley Clarke, Larry Carlton and Billy Cobham (July 1994, Sony)
 2003  "One Night Alone"  Live with Prince

Compilation albums 
 1998  Best of Najee (Blue Note/Capitol)
 2000  Love Songs 
 2003  Classic Masters

Other appearances 
 Rainbow Children Prince
 Street Life Will Downing
 Christmas Love and You Will Downing
 Unconditional Love Ruben Studdard
 Out of A Dream Brian Simpson
 Truth B Told Paul Brown
 If Only For One Night Charles Earland
 The Best of Pieces of A dream Vol. 2 Pieces of a Dream
 The Weather Channel Presents: The Best of Smooth Jazz Breakin' In Space with Key-Matic (1984, Radar Records (US))
 The Best (2004-2017) - Incognito
 Bein' Green - Roberto Tola
 The Journey Nick Colionne
 New Urban Jazz - Bob Baldwin
 “D” Tales - Robert Damper

Billboard chartsNajee's ThemeTop Contemporary Jazz Albums No. 1
Top Jazz Albums No. 8
Top R&B/Hip-Hop Albums No. 12
The Billboard 200 No. 56Day by DayTop Contemporary Jazz Albums No. 6
Top R&B/Hip-Hop Albums No. 23
The Billboard 200 No. 76Tokyo BlueTop Contemporary Jazz Albums No. 1
Top R&B/Hip-Hop Albums No. 17
The Billboard 200 No. 63Just an IllusionTop Contemporary Jazz Albums No. 5
Top R&B/Hip-Hop Albums No. 25
The Billboard 200 No. 107Share My WorldTop Contemporary Jazz Albums No. 2
Top R&B/Hip-Hop Albums No. 23
The Billboard 200 No. 163Songs from the Key of LifeTop Contemporary Jazz Albums No. 6
Top R&B/Hip-Hop Albums No. 67Morning TendernessTop Contemporary Jazz Albums No. 2
Top R&B/Hip-Hop Albums No. 65The Best of NajeeTop Contemporary Jazz Albums No. 15Love SongsTop Contemporary Jazz Albums No. 23EmbraceTop Contemporary Jazz Albums No. 7
Top R&B/Hip-Hop Albums No. 82My Point of ViewTop Contemporary Jazz Album No. 1"Rising Sun"Top Contemporary Jazz Album No. 1"Mind Over Matter"''
Top Contemporary Jazz Album No. 2
Billboard Jazz Album No.4

"Sweet Summer Nights" 
Smooth Jazz Song No. 1

“The Morning After” 
Top Contemporary Album No. 1

“You Me and Forever”
Smooth Jazz Global Radio No. 1
“Fly With The Wind” No. 1 most added song

"Poetry In Motion"
"Let's Take It Back" - Featuring Incognito
Billboard No. 1
Smooth Jazz Global Radio No. 1

References

External links
Official site

American jazz soprano saxophonists
American jazz alto saxophonists
American jazz tenor saxophonists
American male saxophonists
American jazz flautists
Smooth jazz saxophonists
Smooth jazz flautists
New Power Generation members
Living people
Heads Up International artists
Musicians from New York City
1957 births
Jazz musicians from New York (state)
21st-century saxophonists
American male jazz musicians
21st-century flautists